Ignatian Solidarity Network (ISN) organizes Jesuit schools and universities in the United States, together with their alumni and all interested parties, in training and advocacy for social justice leadership. This is in pursuit of "the service of faith and promotion of justice" that was emphasized by Jesuit Father General Pedro Arrupe and by the Catholic bishops after Vatican II. The founding of ISN was in response to the US connection in the 1989 murders of Jesuits in El Salvador.

References

Jesuit development centres
Organizations established in 1994
Social justice organizations
Human rights organizations based in the United States
Poverty-related organizations
Peace organizations